Phosphate-buffered saline (PBS) is a buffer solution (pH ~ 7.4) commonly used in biological research. It is a water-based salt solution containing disodium hydrogen phosphate, sodium chloride and, in some formulations, potassium chloride and potassium dihydrogen phosphate. The buffer helps to maintain a constant pH. The osmolarity and ion concentrations of the solutions match those of the human body (isotonic).

Applications
PBS has many uses because it is isotonic and non-toxic to most cells. These uses include substance dilution and cell container rinsing. PBS with EDTA is also used to disengage attached and clumped cells. Divalent metals such as zinc, however, cannot be added as this will result in precipitation.  For these types of applications, Good's buffers are recommended. PBS has been shown to be an acceptable alternative to viral transport medium regarding transport and storage of RNA viruses, such as SARS-CoV-2

Preparation
There are many different ways to prepare PBS solutions (one of them is Dulbecco's phosphate-buffered saline (DPBS), which has a different composition than that of standard PBS). Some formulations do not contain potassium and magnesium, while other ones contain calcium and/or magnesium (depending on whether or not the buffer is used on live or fixed tissue: the latter does not require CaCl2 or MgCl2 ).

Start with 800 mL of distilled water to dissolve all salts. Add distilled water to a total volume of 1 liter. The resultant 1× PBS will have a final concentration of 157 mM Na+, 140mM Cl−, 4.45mM K+, 10.1 mM HPO42−, 1.76 mM H2PO4− and a pH of 7.96. Add 2.84 mM of HCl to shift the buffer to 7.3 mM  HPO42− and 4.6 mM H2PO4− for a final pH of 7.4 and a Cl− concentration of 142 mM.

The pH of PBS is ~7.4. When making buffer solutions, it is good practice to always measure the pH directly using a pH meter. If necessary, pH can be adjusted using hydrochloric acid or sodium hydroxide.

PBS can also be prepared by using commercially made PBS buffer tablets or pouches.

If used in cell culturing, the solution can be dispensed into aliquots and sterilized by autoclaving or filtration. Sterilization may not be necessary depending on its use. PBS can be stored at room temperature or in the refrigerator. However, concentrated stock solutions may precipitate when cooled and should be kept at room temperature until precipitate has completely dissolved before use.

See also
 Borate-buffered saline
 Tris-buffered saline
 Brine

References

External links
 http://www.bioind.com/products/cell-culture/cell-culture-reagents/balanced-salt-solutions/dpbs-dulbecco-s-phosphate-buffered-saline/

Buffer solutions
Biochemistry
Biochemistry methods
Cell culture reagents